Mezana or Mizan is a district of Zabul province in southern Afghanistan.

Demographics 
It has a population of about 13,400 as of 2013. The district is mostly populated by the Hotak tribe of Ghilji Pashtuns.

History
On 18 May 2020, a roadside IED planted by militants in Mezana District killed four civilians and injured nine others.

See also 
Districts of Afghanistan

References

External links 

Districts of Zabul Province